The following are the national records in Olympic weightlifting in the Czech Republic. Records are maintained in each weight class for the snatch lift, clean and jerk lift, and the total for both lifts by the Czech Weightlifting Federation (Český svaz vzpírání).

Current records
Key to tables:

Men

Women

Historical records

Men (1998–2018)

Women (1998–2018)

References
General
Czech weightlifting records 31 December 2022 updated
Specific

External links
ČSV web site

Czech
records
Olympic weightlifting
weightlifting